Ben Saunders (born 9 July 1983) is a Dutch singer who won the first-ever title of the Dutch singing competition series The Voice of Holland broadcast on RTL 4. The final of 2010–2011 season was held live on 21 January 2011. Saunders is also a tattoo artist. He is popularly known as "Tattoo Ben".

Early life
Saunders is of English origin. He is the younger brother of Dean Saunders who on 22 January 2011, won the title of the third season (2010–2011) of the Dutch music competition Popstars, notably only a day after Ben's victory on The Voice.

Brothers Ben and Dean Saunders both started applying to talent competitions early like for the series Daddy's Wish. They also took part in 1998 in Life is like a box of chocolates program.

Career

1998–2003: Follow That Dream

In 2000, Dean and Ben Saunders both took part in RTL 4's Alles voor de band: Follow that dream. They were part of the band Follow That Dream (F.T.D.) (that included besides the two brothers Vanessa Eman, Rosa Vuik, Linda van Toornburg and Peter van der Meer. The band was signed to Dino Music record label.

Their debut single the self-titled "Follow That Dream" was released in November 2000 reaching No. 25 in the Dutch Top 40. 6 months later, the band split after the great popularity of the rival Starmaker show.

2003: Eurovision Song Contest entry
On 15 February 2003 the Saunders brothers took part in the 2003 Dutch Nationaal Songfestival, a Dutch national music pre-selection contest for qualification to Eurovision Song Contest to be held in Riga, Latvia. They performed the song "Stand As One" in the third heat under the name "The Brothers" getting just 10 points and finishing with 3% of the popular vote as seventh out of 8 participants.

2010–present: The Voice of Holland
In 2010, Ben Saunders applied to The Voice of Holland singing competition proving to be very popular with both judges and the voting public, after singing in his audition "Use Somebody" from Kings of Leon. Ben was coached by Roel van Velzen. In the final, he sang his number one single, his cover version rendition of "If You Don't Know Me by Now" and duetted with Welsh singer Duffy on her song "Warwick Avenue" and won by 59% of the votes against runner-up Pearl Jozefzoon.

Saunders has charted with four different songs in the top 15 of the Dutch charts, including attaining No. 1 position with his single "Kill For a Broken Heart".

Personal life
Ben Saunders was born in England in 1983, but moved to the Netherlands in 1986, aged three. He resided in Hoorn, about 35 kilometres north of Amsterdam.

Before applying to the competition, Ben Saunders worked as a tattoo artist. He owned a tattoo parlour in Hoorn. He was popularly nicknamed "Tattoo Ben" because of his extensive tattoos.

In 2014 Saunders joined the notorious Satudarah motor club; club meetings are occasionally hosted in his tattoo parlour since. In May 2015 Saunders was arrested for assaulting a traffic warden.

Discography

Albums

Singles

References

Dutch people of English descent
English male singers
1983 births
Dutch male singers
English emigrants to the Netherlands
Living people
British tattoo artists
The Voice (franchise) winners
Singers from London
21st-century English singers
21st-century Dutch singers
21st-century British male singers
MTV Europe Music Award winners